Landgravine Elisabeth Amalie of Hesse-Darmstadt (Elisabeth Amalie Magdalene; 20 March 1635 – 4 August 1709) was a princess of Hesse-Darmstadt. She became Electress Palatine as the second wife of Philip William, Elector Palatine.

Biography

Born at the New Palace in Gießen, Elisabeth Amalie was the daughter of George II, Landgrave of Hesse-Darmstadt and Sophia Eleonore of Saxony. Her siblings included Louis of Hesse-Darmstadt, future Landgrave of Hesse-Darmstadt and Anna Sophia, Abbess of Quedlinburg.

Elisabeth Amalie was brought up strictly by her mother, who was a devout Lutheran. She had an attractive appearance with striking blond hair, a trait she kept until her old age and which was inherited by her daughters Eleonor Magdalene and Dorothea Sophie, the latter being known in particular for her blonde hair.

On 3 September 1653 she was married at Langenschwalbach to Count palatine Philip William of Neuburg, who later became Prince-elector of the Palatinate. Her husband was some twenty years older than she and was the heir to the Electoral Palatinate which was one of the most important states within the Holy Roman Empire.

She converted to Catholicism on 1 November 1653 in the presence of the elector and archbishop of Cologne, Maximilian Henry of Bavaria.

The writer William Nakatenus dedicated his work The Heavenly Palm little garden to her.

Issue

Ancestry

References
 Choker, Peter, Diseases of the kings of Spain: the Austrians. From Madness to impotence Joan of Charles II the Bewitched (Madrid: The Sphere Books Ltd., 2005).

External links
 Person Page
 Landeshauptstadt Düsseldorf - Elisabeth Amalie Magdalena (1635 - 1709), Landgräfin von Hessen-Darmstadt, Pfalzgräfin bei Rhein zu Neuburg, Herzogin von  Jülich-Berg, seit 1685 Kurfürstin von der Pfalz
 
 
 
 

|-

1635 births
1709 deaths
German Roman Catholics
Electoral Princesses of the Palatinate
People from Giessen
House of Hesse-Darmstadt
Countesses Palatine of Neuburg
House of Wittelsbach
Electresses of the Palatinate
Duchesses of Jülich
Duchesses of Berg
Converts to Roman Catholicism from Lutheranism
People from the Rhine Province
Landgravines of Hesse-Darmstadt
Daughters of monarchs